Sadiyaan is a Bollywood film released in 2010 which stars Luv Sinha, Feryna Wazheir, Rishi Kapoor, Hema Malini, Javed Sheikh and Rekha. The story is about a family during the partition of India. The film was directed by Raj Kanwar and it has been distributed by the B4U (network) and known as a B4U Movies Production. It was released on Friday, 2 April 2010.

Plot 
During the 1947 partition, the Lahore based family of Rajveer (Rishi Kapoor) and Amrit (Rekha) has to flee Pakistan and settle in Amritsar, Punjab. In the house that they get to stay, Amrit finds an abandoned baby boy of the Muslim family who owned the house but fled to Pakistan because of communal riots. Amrit raises the boy as her own and he grows up to be Ishaan (Luv Sinha). During a summer camp visit to Kashmir, Ishaan falls in love with Chandni (Feryna Wazheir). When he goes to her house to ask her hand in marriage, her father (Deep Dhillon) and uncle (Ahmed Khan) tell him to forget her as they are against her marrying a Sikh boy. When Amrit and Rajveer come to know about this they finally declare the truth to Ishaan that he is a Muslim in reality and not their child. He doesn't believe them and Chandni's parents refuse to believe it without proof. The old couple then decides to track Ishaan's real parents down and also succeed. Ishaan's real mother, Benazir (Hema Malini) comes down with his real father (Javed Sheikh) to take back custody of a now grown-up Ishaan. Chandni's parents immediately agree to the marriage when Ishaan's real parents visit their house. What complications arise when Ishaan's parents start making plans to take Ishaan and his bride back to Pakistan and how they are handled by the principal characters forms the rest of the plot.

Cast 
Luv Sinha as Ishaan
Feryna Wazheir as Chandni
Rekha as Amrit
Hema Malini as Benazir
Rishi Kapoor as Rajveer
Vivek Shauq
Shakeel Siddiqui
Neetu Chandra
Deep Dhillon
Ahmed Khan
Avtar Gill
Gurpreet Ghuggi

Soundtrack
"Taron Bhari Hai Ye Raat Sajan" - Adnan Sami & Sunidhi Chauhan
"Dekha Tujhay Jo Pehli Baar" - Shaan
"Jadu Nasha, Ehsas Kya" - Shaan & Sadhana Sargam
"Man Mouji Matwala" - Mika Singh
"Pehla Pehla Tejurba Hai" - Kunal Ganjawala & Sunidhi Chauhan
"Sargoshiyo Ke Kya Silsile Hai" - Raja Hasan & Shreya Ghoshal
"Sona Lagdha Mahi Sona Lagdha" - Richa Sharma & Sabri Brothers
"Waqt Ne Jo Bij Boyaa" - Rekha Bhardwaj

Awards and nominations

2011 Zee Cine Awards

Nominated
Best Male Debut – Luv Sinha
Best Female Debut – Feryna Wazheir

References

External links
 

2010s Hindi-language films
2010 films
Films directed by Raj Kanwar